This is a list of social democratic and democratic socialist parties which have governed countries, whether as the ruling party or as a member of a governing coalition. Most of these parties were members of the Socialist International.

Political parties

Currently represented 
The following is a list of democratic socialist or partially democratic socialist parties which are currently being represented in the legislature of their country. It does not include democratic socialist parties that are mainly social democratic and are considered to their right within the centre-left.
 

 Parties which are also social democratic.

See also 
 List of social democratic parties
 List of democratic socialist parties and organizations
 List of socialist parties with national parliamentary representation
 List of communist parties represented in European Parliament

References 

Left-wing politics
Lists of political parties
Socialism-related lists